Božo Ljubić (born 30 September 1949) is a Bosnian Croat politician who is the current president of the Supreme Council of the Croatian National Assembly. Formerly, he was a member of both the national House of Peoples and national House of Representatives.

Ljubić served as Minister of Communication and Traffic from 2007 to 2009 as well. He was a prominent figure of the Croatian Democratic Union, until he left it in 2006 to establish the Croatian Democratic Union 1990. Ljubić the party in 2014.

Biography
Ljubić was a member of the Croatian Democratic Union of Bosnia and Herzegovina (HDZ BiH). He came to prominence when in June 2005 he opposed the internal election of Dragan Čović to the party presidency, claiming electoral fraud.

In April 2006, the rift between Ljubić and the main party line escalated, and he led the formation of the Croatian Democratic Union 1990 (HDZ 1990). The new party was welcomed by the Roman Catholic bishop of Banja Luka Franjo Komarica and the president of the Croatian Democratic Union (HDZ) and Croatian prime minister Ivo Sanader.

The new party's candidates ran for office in the 2006 general election and achieved moderate success. Ljubić was the candidate for the Croat seat in the Presidency of Bosnia and Herzegovina, but came in third with 18% of the vote, after both Željko Komšić of the SDP BiH and Ivo Miro Jović of the HDZ BiH.

From 11 January 2007 until 23 June 2009, he served as Minister of Communication and Traffic.

In 2014, Ljubić left the HDZ 1990 and gave his support to the HDZ BiH in the 2014 general election. Currently, he is the president of the General Council of the Croatian National Assembly.

In 2016, the Constitutional Court of Bosnia and Herzegovina granted the request of Ljubić for review of the constitutionality of the Election Law of Bosnia and Herzegovina. The court  established that the Election Law is in contravention to the principle of constituent status of peoples, i.e. the principle of equality of all constituent peoples (Croats, Serbs, Bosniaks) in Bosnia and Herzegovina.

References

External links

Božo Ljubić M.D. PhD - Biography

1949 births
Living people
People from Široki Brijeg
Croats of Bosnia and Herzegovina
Croatian Democratic Union of Bosnia and Herzegovina politicians
Government ministers of Bosnia and Herzegovina
Members of the House of Peoples of Bosnia and Herzegovina
Members of the House of Representatives (Bosnia and Herzegovina)
Chairmen of the House of Representatives (Bosnia and Herzegovina)
Representatives in the modern Croatian Parliament